Zeng Chongsheng (born June 10, 1993) is a Chinese chess grandmaster. He played for the bronze medal-winning Chinese team at the World Youth Under-16 Chess Olympiad in 2006. In 2016, Zeng shared second place at the Chinese championship with Bai Jinshi, and the 20th Hogeschool Zeeland Tournament in Vlissingen with Alberto David and Sipke Ernst.

References

External links

Chongsheng Zeng chess games at 365Chess.com

1993 births
Living people
Chess grandmasters
Chess players from Guangdong